The 1969 Oregon State Beavers football team represented Oregon State University during the 1969 NCAA University Division football season. Home games were played on campus in Corvallis at Parker Stadium, with one at Civic Stadium in Portland. Both installed artificial turf prior to the season.

Under fifth-year head coach Dee Andros, the Beavers were 6–4 overall and 4–3 in the Pacific-8 Conference (Pac-8). In the Civil War game against Oregon in Eugene, the first on artificial turf, OSU won for the sixth consecutive year.

Schedule

Source:

Roster

References

External links
 1969 Oregon State University Football Media Guide, Oregon Digital, www.oregondigital.org/

Oregon State
Oregon State Beavers football seasons
Oregon State Beavers football